The Pishteginids (Bishkinids, Pishkinids) were a dynasty of maliks in Iran which ruled, from 1155 to 1231, Ahar and its adjacent district as vassals to the Shaddadids of Arran. The family descended from a Georgian nobleman captured by the Seljuqid sultan Alp Arslan during his 1068 expedition against Georgia and brought as a prisoner to Iran. The dynasty fell to the Khwarezmian conquests between 1125 and 1131. The last two dynasts of the family issued their own coins, placing their names next to those of the Caliph and Eldiguzid atabeg. The name of Meshkinshahr, a town east of Ahar, seems to have been derived from the Pishkinid dynasty.

References 

Iranian Muslim dynasties
12th century in Iran
13th century in Iran
Iranian people of Georgian descent
History of East Azerbaijan Province
Medieval Iranian Azerbaijan